William Frederick Blinn (July 21, 1937 – October 22, 2020) was an American screenwriter and television producer.

Life and career
Blinn was born in Toledo, Ohio, the son of Clare Allen and Pearl Ariel (Schaeffer) Blinn. Blinn began his career in television in the 1960s. As a screenwriter, Blinn wrote episodes of Rawhide, Gunsmoke, The Rookies, Here Come the Brides and Shane (where he was also story editor), and Fame (where he also served as executive producer). In 1971, Blinn wrote the screenplay for the television movie Brian's Song for which he won an Emmy and Peabody Award. He won a second Emmy in 1977 for his work on the miniseries Roots. Blinn also created two series for producing mogul Aaron Spelling: Starsky & Hutch (Blinn later produced the 2004 film of the same name); and the less-successful Heaven Help Us, which co-starred Ricardo Montalbán, known for his role in Fantasy Island. He was the executive producer of the 1974 ABC series The New Land, and he created the short-lived 1977 CBS espionage series Hunter and wrote its unaired 1976 pilot. He was also a writer for the 1996 Hallmark Television film The Boys Next Door based on the play of the same name. His other series were Eight Is Enough, Our House and Fame.

In addition to screenwriting (which includes Purple Rain), Blinn also produced several television series and television movies including Aaron's Way, Polly: Comin' Home!, and Pensacola: Wings of Gold.

Death
Blinn died on October 22, 2020, from natural causes at a retirement home in Burbank, California.

Awards and nominations

References

External links
 
 

1937 births
2020 deaths
Writers from Toledo, Ohio
American male screenwriters
Television producers from Ohio
Primetime Emmy Award winners
Peabody Award winners
Writers Guild of America Award winners
Screenwriters from Ohio
Starsky & Hutch